Osvaldo Boretto (born 10 August 1952) is an Argentine former swimmer. He competed at the 1968 Summer Olympics and the 1972 Summer Olympics.

References

1952 births
Living people
Argentine male swimmers
Olympic swimmers of Argentina
Swimmers at the 1968 Summer Olympics
Swimmers at the 1972 Summer Olympics
Sportspeople from Córdoba, Argentina
20th-century Argentine people